Rap Star is a Chinese rap competition television series that airs on the streaming service platform Mango TV.  The show, which is hosted by Du Haitao, features judges including Wang Linkai (Xiao Gui), Tia Ray, Danko, Yang Changqing, Air, Mc Guang Guang, Fa Lao, and Pact.  The show is the second major Chinese rap competition show after The Rap of China, which airs on iQIYI since 2017.

The first season of Rap Star began airing on June 7, 2020 and concluded on August 30, 2020.

The second season of Rap Star began airing on July 18, 2021.

See also
 The Rap of China, rap competition show on iQIYI
 Rap for Youth, rap competition show on Bilibili

References

External links
 Rap Star season 1 on Mango TV (in Chinese)
 Rap Star season 2 on Mango TV (in Chinese)
 

2020 Chinese television series debuts
Chinese reality television series
Chinese music television series
Chinese-language television shows
Mango TV original programming